Nikita Alekseyevich Panassenko (born ) is a Kazakhstani cyclist riding for . He won the bronze medal in the  madison at the 2016 Asian Cycling Championships.

Major results
2015
1st Stage 4 Tour of Bulgaria

References

External links
 Profile at cyclingarchives.com

1992 births
Living people
Kazakhstani track cyclists
Kazakhstani male cyclists
Place of birth missing (living people)
Cyclists at the 2014 Asian Games
Cyclists at the 2018 Asian Games
Asian Games competitors for Kazakhstan
21st-century Kazakhstani people